This is list of European Union member states by unemployment and employment rate.

Map

Map of unemployment and employment rates:

Table

See also

List of European regions by unemployment rate
List of European Union member states by minimum wage
List of European Union member states by average wage
Economy of the European Union
List of European countries by budget revenues
List of European countries by GDP (nominal) per capita
List of European countries by GDP (PPP) per capita
List of European countries by GNI (nominal) per capita
List of European countries by GNI (PPP) per capita
List of countries by GDP (nominal) per capita
List of countries by GDP (PPP) per capita
List of countries by GDP (nominal)
List of countries by GDP (PPP)

References

 Employment rate in the EU27 fell to 64.6% in 2009
 Countries surrounding the EU

European Union member economies
European Union-related lists
Unemployment Rate, Europe
Lists of countries by per capita values
Europe
Economy of Europe-related lists